Louis Dominick Lynch (1904 – 5 August 1976) was an Irish nationalist politician and newspaper owner.

Born in Omagh, Lynch became managing director and owner of the Ulster Herald series of newspapers.

From 1949 until 1957, Lynch served as a Nationalist Party member of the Senate of Northern Ireland.

References

1904 births
1976 deaths
Members of the Senate of Northern Ireland 1949–1953
Members of the Senate of Northern Ireland 1953–1957
Nationalist Party (Ireland) members of the Senate of Northern Ireland
Newspaper executives
People from Omagh